Poclușa may refer to several places in Bihor County, Romania:

 Poclușa de Barcău, a village in Chișlaz Commune
 Poclușa de Beiuș, a village in Șoimi Commune
 Poclușa (river), a tributary of the Crișul Negru